Ariadne was built in 1795 at Newbury, Massachusetts, probably under another name. She became a Liverpool-based slave ship in 1801. A French or Dutch privateer captured her in 1804, but a Liverpool-based vessel recaptured her. Then in 1806 a French privateer captured her and took her into Guadeloupe.

Career
Ariadne first appeared in Lloyd's Register (LR) in 1803 with M'Bride, master, Kitchen, owner, and trade Liverpool–Africa. However, by then she had already completed one slave voyage.

1st slave voyage (1801–1802)
Captain Thomas Mollett sailed from Liverpool on 6 September 1801. Ariadne delivered her slaves at Demerara on 8 February 1802. There she landed 161 slaves. She returned to Liverpool on 17 June 1802. she had left Liverpool with 23 crew members and she suffered 12 crew deaths on her voyage.

2nd slave voyage (1802–1803)
Captain William McBride sailed from Liverpool on 1 August 1802. Ariadne gathered her slaves at Rio Pongo and delivered them to Demerara on 22 March 1803. She left Demerara on 24 April, and arrived back at Liverpool on 9 June 1803. She had left Liverpool with 20 crew members and she suffered eight crew deaths on her voyage.

3rd slave voyage (1803–1804)
Captain William McBride acquired a letter of marque on 11 July 1803. He sailed from Liverpool on 28 July 1803.  Lloyd's List reported on 3 February 1804 that Ariadne, McBride, master, had arrived at Africa from Liverpool.

Lloyd's List reported on 6 March 1804 that a French privateer of 14 guns and 150 men had captured Ariadne, McBride, master, off Angola.

Ariadne arrived at Montevideo on 30 December 1803. There she disembarked 18 slaves, suggesting that she had only begun to gather her slaves before she was captured. 

Lloyd's List reported on 24 August 1804 that Ariadne, Fiott, master, late McBride, had returned to Liverpool. The Dutch ship Hooe, fittd out at the Cape of Good Hope, had captured her off the coast of Africa, but Alexander, of Liverpool, had recaptured her. She arrived back at Liverpool on 20 August 1804. 

LR for 1805 showed Ariadne with McBride, master, changing to J. Carrol, Kitchen & Co., owners, and trade Liverpool–Africa.

Voyage to Africa (1805)
Captain James Pierce Carroll acquired a letter of marque on 6 April 1805. Lloyd's List reported on 17 December 1805 that Ariadne, Carroll, master, had arrived at Cork from Africa.

4th slave trading voyage (1806–Loss)
Captain Robert Thompson acquired a letter of marque on 18 March 1806. He left Liverpool on 7 April.

Lloyd's List reported on 30 September that Ariadne, Thompson, master, had arrived at Loango from Liverpool.

Fate
Lloyd's List reported on 28 November that the French privateer Guadaloupienne had captured Ariadne, of Liverpool and from Angola, and taken her into .

Citations

1795 ships
Ships built in the United States
Age of Sail merchant ships of England
Liverpool slave ships
Captured ships